Echidnodella is a genus of fungi in the Asterinaceae family. The relationship of this taxon to other taxa within the class is unknown (incertae sedis), and it has not yet been placed with certainty into any order.

Species
As accepted by Species Fungorum;

 Echidnodella africana 
 Echidnodella angustiformis 
 Echidnodella camphorae 
 Echidnodella cavendishiae 
 Echidnodella cedralensis 
 Echidnodella crustacea 
 Echidnodella damnacanthi 
 Echidnodella diaphana 
 Echidnodella furcraeae 
 Echidnodella guatemalensis 
 Echidnodella hopeae 
 Echidnodella imadae 
 Echidnodella linearis 
 Echidnodella lucumae 
 Echidnodella mabae 
 Echidnodella manilkarae 
 Echidnodella melastomacearum 
 Echidnodella memecyli 
 Echidnodella miconiae 
 Echidnodella mimusopis 
 Echidnodella myrciae 
 Echidnodella myristicacearum 
 Echidnodella natalensis 
 Echidnodella nephrodii 
 Echidnodella polyalthiae 
 Echidnodella psychotriae 
 Echidnodella raillardiae 
 Echidnodella ramosii 
 Echidnodella rapaneae 
 Echidnodella rondeletiae 
 Echidnodella rugispora 
 Echidnodella syzygii 

Former species;
 E. cocculi  = Lembosina cocculi, Lembosinaceae family
 E. hypolepidis  = Echidnodes hypolepidis Asterinaceae
 E. vateriae  = Marthomamyces vateriae Asterinaceae

References

External links
Index Fungorum

Asterinaceae